The New Zealand Fire Service Commission was the overseeing authority controlling the New Zealand Fire Service and the New Zealand National Rural Fire Authority. A Crown entity reporting to the Minister of Internal Affairs, the Commission was established by the New Zealand Fire Service Act 1975. The Commission was dissolved on 30 June 2017 when it was replaced by the Fire and Emergency New Zealand Board.

The Commission was composed of five members appointed by the Governor-General. By law, at least one member must be experienced in fire engineering or a senior operational firefighting.

At the time of dissolution, the members of the Commission were:

 Hon Paul Swain QSO (Chairperson)
 Dr Nicola Crauford (Deputy Chair)
 Te Arohanui Cook
 Angela Hauk-Willis
 Peter Drummond MNZM

The Commission members became members of the Board of Fire and Emergency New Zealand on 1 July 2017.

References

New Zealand Crown agents
Firefighting in New Zealand
Former government agencies of New Zealand